Madhu Bhagat is an Indian politician and a member of the Indian National Congress.

Political career
He became an MLA in 2013.

Political views
He supports Congress Party's ideology.

Personal life
He is married to Bhavna Bhagat.
In 2016, he had undergone bypass surgery after a heart attack at Shelby Hospital, Jabalpur.

References

See also
Madhya Pradesh Legislative Assembly
2013 Madhya Pradesh Legislative Assembly election
2008 Madhya Pradesh Legislative Assembly election

1965 births
Living people
Indian National Congress politicians from Madhya Pradesh